Tomopleura spiralissima is a species of sea snail, a marine gastropod mollusk in the family Borsoniidae.

Description
The length of the shell varies between 9.5 mm and 20.7 mm.

The pallid brown shell has a fusiform shape. It is cingulated with carinae, of which there are about twelve on the body whorl, subequal, interstices obliquely striate. The aperture is narrow. The collumella is blackish brown. The siphonal canal is very short. The outer lip is thin, with a large sinus.

Distribution
This marine species occurs in the Atlantic Ocean off West Africa, Congo and Angola

References

  Gofas S. & Rolán E. (2009) A systematic review of "Asthenotoma spiralis (Smith, 1872)" in West Africa, with description of two new species (Mollusca, Gastropoda, Conoidea). Zoosystema 31: 5-16
 Smith E. A. 1872. A list of species of shells from West Africa, with descriptions of those hitherto undescribed. Proceedings of the Zoological Society of London 1871: 727–739, pl. 75

External links

spiralissima
Gastropods described in 2009